HMCS Fredericton may refer to:

, was a  that served during the Battle of the Atlantic
, a  commissioned in 1994

Battle honours
Atlantic, 1942–45
Arabian Sea

Royal Canadian Navy ship names